Dedrique LaMonte Taylor (born May 1, 1974) is the current college basketball head coach for Cal State Fullerton. He is also a former Arizona State associate head men's basketball coach and a college assistant coach.

Early life and education
After graduating from Pomona High School in Pomona, California in 1992, Taylor began his college basketball career at Kings River Community College (now Reedley College). He then transferred to NCAA Division II school Armstrong Atlantic State University (now Armstrong State University) in 1994 and played his last two seasons at UC Davis from 1995 to 1997. Taylor graduated from UC Davis in 1997 with a bachelor's degree in sociology and organizational studies and later completed a master's degree in sports administration in 2000 at the United States Sports Academy.

Coaching career

Early coaching career (2000–2013)

Taylor began his coaching career in 2000 at UC Davis. In 2001, he became strength and conditioning coach at Loyola Marymount. From 2002 to 2004, he was an assistant coach at Portland State, followed by two years at Nevada as assistant coach from 2004 to 2006.

Taylor was an assistant coach for Arizona State University from 2006 to 2013. In 2010, he was promoted to associate head coach named one of the top 25 assistant coaches in the nation by CollegeInsider.com. He helped ASU make four 20-win seasons, including a 25-10 overall record in 2008-2009. In 2012–13, Taylor guided the Sun Devils to a 22-13 record and advanced to the second round of the National Invitational Tournament.

Cal State Fullerton (2013–present)
Taylor was named the head coach at Cal State Fullerton, a member of the Big West Conference, in April 2013. Taylor achieved his first winning season in 2016–17 when Cal State Fullerton finished 17–15 (10–6 Big West), also Fullerton's first winning season in five years. Having finished third in the Big West standings, Cal State Fullerton appeared in the 2017 CollegeInsider.com Postseason Tournament.

In his fifth season in 2017–18, Taylor led Cal State Fullerton to a career high 20–12 (10–6 Big West) the first Big West tournament title and NCAA tournament appearance in 10 years. Then in 2018–19, Cal State Fullerton finished tied for second in the Big West standings and appeared in the 2019 CollegeInsider.com Postseason Tournament.

On February 23, 2021, Taylor achieved his 100th win as head coach.
In 2021–22, Taylor reached a new career high in wins with a 21–10 (12–5 Big West) record. Cal State Fullerton won its second Big West tournament under Taylor with a 72–71 win over Long Beach State.

Head coaching record

References

1974 births
Living people
American men's basketball coaches
American men's basketball players
Arizona State Sun Devils men's basketball coaches
Armstrong State Pirates men's basketball players
Basketball coaches from California
Basketball players from California
Cal State Fullerton Titans men's basketball coaches
College men's basketball head coaches in the United States
Junior college men's basketball players in the United States
Loyola Marymount Lions men's basketball coaches
Nevada Wolf Pack men's basketball coaches
Portland State Vikings men's basketball players
Sportspeople from Pomona, California
UC Davis Aggies men's basketball coaches
UC Davis Aggies men's basketball players